Ses plus grands succès (French for "His/her greatest hits") and Ses grands succès (French for "His/her great hits") are popular titles for a greatest-hits album by a French-speaking artist.

Ses plus grands succès:
 Ses plus grands succès (Desireless album)
 Ses plus grands succès (Joe Dassin album)
 , a 1976 greatest-hits album by Claude Dubois

Ses grands succès:
 , a 1981 greatest-hits album by William Sheller
 France Gall (1973 album), also known as Ses grands succès, a 1973 album by France Gall